Down Bank is a  biological Site of Special Scientific Interest south-west of Canterbury in Kent.

This sloping chalk meadow has the nationally endangered black-veined moth and twenty-eight species of butterfly, including the nationally scarce Duke of Burgundy. Grassland flora include two nationally scarce species, small bedstraw and man orchid.

A public footpath goes through the site.

References

Sites of Special Scientific Interest in Kent